Bataspur railway station is a railway station of Sahibganj loop line under Howrah railway division of Eastern Railway zone. It is situated at Dakshin Sija, Kagas, Bataspur in Birbhum district in the Indian state of West Bengal. Total 19 passengers trains stop at Bataspur railway station.

References

Railway stations in Birbhum district
Howrah railway division